Marcel Leclef (born 25 July 1909, date of death unknown) was a Belgian bobsledder & industrialist who competed from the late 1940s to the mid-1950s. Competing in three Winter Olympics, he earned his best finish of sixth in the two-man event at Oslo in 1952.

He was born in Antwerp.

References
1948 bobsleigh two-man results
1952 bobsleigh two-man results
1956 bobsleigh two-man results
Marcel Leclef's profile at Sports Reference.com

1909 births
Year of death missing
Belgian male bobsledders
Bobsledders at the 1948 Winter Olympics
Bobsledders at the 1952 Winter Olympics
Bobsledders at the 1956 Winter Olympics
Sportspeople from Antwerp
Recipients of the Olympic Order